Events in the year 1998 in Ukraine.

Incumbents
President: Leonid Kuchma
Prime Minister: Valeriy Pustovoitenko

Events
March 29
1998 Ukrainian parliamentary election
1998 Crimean parliamentary election

Full date unknown
 Kozhaniy Olen', a ska-punk band from Simferopol, is created.

Births

 May 7 – Maryna Piddubna, Paralympic swimmer

Deaths
 April 22 – Vadym Hetman, Chairman of the National Bank of Ukraine 1992–1993

References

 
1990s in Ukraine
Years of the 20th century in Ukraine
Ukraine
Ukraine